Daitari Naik also known as Canal Man of Odisha is an Indian agriculturalist. In 2019, he has been awarded Padma Shri by the Indian Government for his contribution in agriculture.

Early life
Naik hails from Talabaitarani village in Kenojhar district in Odisha.

Career
Naik was awarded Padma Shri for digging out a 3-km tunnel through the Gonasika mountains in Odisha, between 2010 and 2013.

Awards
Padma Shri in 2019

References

Living people
Recipients of the Padma Shri in social work
Indian agriculturalists
Year of birth missing (living people)